The Definitive Collection is a 2001 compilation album of all the singles released by Swedish pop group ABBA. It consisted of two discs: the first featuring the singles from 1972 to 1979 ("People Need Love" to "Does Your Mother Know"), and the second including the singles from 1979 to 1982 ("Voulez-Vous" to "Under Attack"), with the tracks being listed in chronological order. The main exception is the track "Thank You for the Music", which, despite being written and recorded in 1977, was in fact released as a single (primarily in the UK) in 1983 after the band had split up. It appears on disc two, along with two bonus tracks, "Ring Ring" (1974 UK single remix), and "Voulez-Vous" (1979 US promo extended remix). The Australian version of The Definitive Collection adds a further two bonus tracks: "Rock Me" and "Hasta Mañana". The 1974 remix of "Ring Ring" is the first appearance on CD of this version mastered from the original master tape, after the UK single master tapes had been returned to Polar Music by the former UK licensees, Epic Records. The track's previous appearance on CD, in a 1999 singles boxed set, was mastered from a vinyl single.

The Definitive Collection is the only ABBA compilation to include all the UK single releases from 1973 to 1983. The four "unofficial" UK ABBA singles are included, these being the 1974 remix of "Ring Ring", "Angeleyes", "Lay All Your Love on Me" and "Thank You for the Music". An "unofficial single" is one that was not released by ABBA's record label, Polar Music, in any Scandinavian country. A DVD also called The Definitive Collection was released in 2002, and features all of ABBA's videos, as well as five bonus videos and a picture gallery. In the US the 2-CD set was bundled with the DVD.

In 2003, the album was ranked number 179 on Rolling Stone magazine's list of the 500 greatest albums of all time, 
 maintaining the rating in a 2012 revised list, and coming in at number 303 in the 2020 edition.

The album was re-released in 2012 as The Essential Collection with different artwork. This version removed both bonus tracks but added four tracks for which there were promotional videos: "Bang-A-Boomerang", "That's Me", "One Man, One Woman" and "Happy New Year". These tracks were included chronologically, and additionally "Thank You for the Music" was moved from the end of the album to its chronological place after "Eagle". The collection was released as a two-CD set, a DVD, and a three-disc set including the DVD and both CDs.

Track listing
All songs which are written by Benny Andersson and Björn Ulvaeus unless otherwise noted. Tracks 1-4 were originally released under the name "Björn & Benny, Agnetha & Anni-Frid".

Disc one

Disc two

DVD

Personnel

Agnetha Fältskog - lead vocals , co-lead vocals , backing vocals
Anni-Frid Lyngstad - lead vocals , co-lead vocals , backing vocals
Björn Ulvaeus - lead vocals , co-lead vocals  acoustic guitar, backing vocals
 Benny Andersson – synthesizer, keyboards, backing vocals

Charts

Weekly charts

Certifications and sales

References 

2001 greatest hits albums
ABBA compilation albums
Universal Music Group compilation albums
Albums recorded at Polar Studios
Albums produced by Björn Ulvaeus
Albums produced by Benny Andersson